The Saraikis, are a Northwestern Indo-Aryan ethnolinguistic group native to the Saraik region in the Punjab province of Pakistan. They are multi-ethnic in origin and speak the Saraiki language.

They are mainly found in a region of southern Punjab known as Saraik or Saraikistan, as well as in most parts of Derajat, which is located in the region where southwestern Punjab, southeastern Khyber Pakhtunkhwa, and northeastern Balochistan meet. Derajat is bound by the Indus River to the east and the Sulaiman Mountains to the west.

The Saraiki people follow many religions, though most are predominantly followers of Islam. A small minority of Saraikis follow Christianity, Hinduism and Sikhism. After the independence of Pakistan in 1947, many Hindus and Sikhs migrated to India where they are known as Multanis, Derawalis and Bhawalpuris. The Saraikis did not see themselves as a distinct ethnic group until the 1960s.

Etymology 
It has been in use for much longer in Sindh to refer to the speech of the immigrants from the north, principally Siraiki-speaking Baloch tribes who settled there between the 16th and the 19th centuries. In this context, the term can most plausibly be explained as originally having had the meaning "the language of the north", from the Sindhi word  'up-river, north'. This name can ambiguously refer to the northern dialects of Sindhi, but these are nowadays more commonly known as "Siroli" or "Sireli".

An alternative hypothesis is that Sarākī originated in the word sauvīrā, or Sauvira, an ancient kingdom which was also mentioned in the Sanskrit epic Mahabharata.

Currently, the most common rendering of the term is Saraiki. However, Seraiki and Siraiki are also commonly used.

Notable people

See also
History of Multan
Saraiki cuisine
Saraiki literature
Saraiki diaspora
Saraikistan
Jhumar

References

External links
 

 
Ethnic groups in Pakistan
Ethnic groups in South Asia
Social groups of Balochistan, Pakistan